"Feeding the Family" is a song by Australian indie rock band Spacey Jane, released on 29 September 2017 as the second single to their debut extended play, No Way to Treat an Animal. It achieved platinum status in Australia in 2022 for selling more than 70,000 units. The track is often credited with the band's rise in popularity, and has been described by many publications as their breakthrough hit.

Release 
Regarding the song's composition, frontman Caleb Harper claimed himself and drummer Kieran Lama had "been sitting on the progression for a while". Lead guitarist Ashton Hardman-Le Cornu's opening riff was "materialised on the spot", with Harper revealing “I remember being so blown away by how Ashton wrote that – almost simultaneously". The song was released on 29 September 2017, premiered at Mojo's Bar in Fremantle, as the second single to the band's debut EP No Way to Treat an Animal (2017). Its cover art was handled by visual artist Alice Ford.

In 2022, "Feeding the Family" achieved certified ARIA platinum status in Australia for selling more than 70,000 units. As of February 2023, the track has over 35 million streams on Spotify.

Reception 
The track was labelled "an immediate radio hit" by Time Out upon its release. Ali Shutler of NME called the track a "wonky-indie gem with buckets of personality", with Australian music publication Pilerats claiming the single to "disregard psychedelic sensibilities and pay homage to a cleaner, harder rock sound". Writing for Scenestr, Gareth Bryant wrote "Feeding the Family" is a "sensational ear-worm with an infectious riff". In 2022, the track polled at number 44 on Perth radio station RTRFM's countdown which ranked the '45 Greatest Songs from Western Australia'.

Legacy 
Many publications including NME and the Canberra Times have described "Feeding the Family" as Spacey Jane's breakout single. Music outlet AU Review claimed the band's "trajectory has generally been upward since they burst on to the scene in 2017" with the track, and Tone Deaf explicitly credited the song for the group "fast becoming a favourite of music fans across the whole country". Online magazine Clash wrote it was "arguably the song that first cemented Spacey Jane as a big game player". Despite Harper claiming the band "don't love playing" the song live anymore, claiming it has "gotten a bit old", it remains a mainstay on their set lists.

In September 2022, during Triple J's annual radio event 'Requestival', Mark McGowan, the premier of Western Australia, personally requested the station to play "Feeding the Family". He introduced the song before it played, concluding "there's some great talent coming out of the West".

Certifications

Release history

Personnel 
Credits adapted from Bandcamp.

Spacey Jane

 Caleb Harper – vocals, guitar, writing
 Ashton Hardman-Le Cornu – lead guitar, writing
 Kieran Lama – drums, writing
 Amelia Murray – bass guitar, writing

Additional personnel

 Calum McLaughlin – recording
 Nick Ireland – recording, mixing
 Rob Grant – recording, mastering
 Alice Ford – cover artwork

Notes

References 

2017 singles
Spacey Jane songs
Songs written by Caleb Harper